Pils may refer to

 Pilsner, a type of beer

People
 Bernhard Pils (born 20 October 1961), Austrian tennis player 
 François Pils (1785–1867), French soldier and painter, father of Isidore
 Isidore Pils (1813/15-1875), French painter

See also
 Rīgas pils or Riga Castle
 Rigas Sporta Pils, an ice hockey arena
 Pilz (disambiguation)